is a Japanese professional footballer who plays as a midfielder for FC Ryukyu.

References

External links

1996 births
Living people
Japanese footballers
Association football midfielders
Kyoto Sanga FC players
FC Ryukyu players
J2 League players